Gerald Webber Prescott (September 25, 1899 – July 7, 1988) was an American botanist, phycologist, and professor.

Career
After serving in World War I, Prescott studied botany at the University of Oregon, earning his B.S. in 1923. He pursued an M.A. from the University of Iowa, which he received in 1926. He continued his studies at Iowa and earned his Ph.D. in 1928.

After receiving his Ph.D, Prescott served as an associate professor at Willamette University from 1928 to 1929, and at Albion College from 1929 to 1946. In 1946, he went on to become a professor of botany at Michigan State College. His areas of research included  limnology and phycology. He remained there until his retirement in 1968. Much of his retirement was spent as Resident Biologist of the University of Montana Biological Station at Yellow Bay, Flathead Lake.

Prescott took part in the Cinchona Missions in Ecuador to help gather quinine to treat malaria in the armed forces during WWII.

Prescott served as president of the Phycological Society of America in 1954, the Association for the Sciences of Limnology and Oceanography in 1965, and the American Microscopical Society in 1968.

Legacy
The Phycological Society of America gives out the Gerald W. Prescott Award to recognize a published book or monograph devoted to phycology, as determined by the G.W. Prescott Award Committee.

References

Botanists with author abbreviations
American botanists
1899 births
1988 deaths
Albion College faculty
Michigan State University faculty